Ron Perry is a musician and American music executive. Perry serves as the Chairman & CEO of Columbia Records. Columbia Records is home to Adele, Beyoncé, Miley Cyrus, Bob Dylan, Bruce Springsteen, The Chainsmokers, Daft Punk, Barbra Streisand, Billy Joel, Tony Bennett, AC/DC, Harry Styles, Polo G, Pharrell, John Mayer, Tyler, the Creator and many of the world's most iconic artists.

At Columbia, Perry has personally signed and overseen the careers of Lil Nas X, The Kid LAROI, Miley Cyrus, BTS (via Big Hit Entertainment), Lil Peep, Rosalía, Dominic Fike, Baby Keem among others. He has also championed successful campaigns by Adele, Harry Styles, Polo G, Tyler, the Creator, John Mayer, Bruce Springsteen, Bob Dylan and others.

Under the leadership of Ron Perry, Columbia Records spent 33 weeks at #1 on the Billboard Hot 100 in 2021, the most in label history.

Early career 
Perry is the former president of SONGS Music Publishing, founded by fellow EMI alum Matt Pincus. A partner of SONGS since the company's inception in 2004, Perry had signed and overseen the careers of artists and songwriters including The Weeknd, XXXTentacion, Lorde, Diplo, DJ Mustard, Major Lazer, Desiigner, Q-Tip and many others.

His signings and record making skills led SONGS Music Publishing to a publishing market share of 5% and to the position of #1 Independent Co-Publisher, for 12 consecutive quarters according to Billboard.

In December 2017, SONGS was sold to Kobalt Music Publishing.

A&R credits 
Some of Perry's A&R credits include:

The 8x Multi-Platinum "Starboy", and the 5× Platinum "I Feel It Coming" for The Weeknd and Daft Punk, a collaboration set up by Perry.

He is also credited as A&R on Lorde's second album Melodrama, which debuted at No. 1 on the Billboard Top 200 and received a Grammy nomination for Album of the Year at the 60th Annual Grammy Awards.

The 14X Diamond single for Lil Nas X, "Old Town Road (featuring Billy Ray Cyrus)." This became the longest running #1 single of all time on the Billboard Hot 100 for 19 consecutive weeks. The song earned 2 Grammy Awards for Music Video of the Year and Best Pop Duo/Group Performance at the 62nd Annual Grammy Awards, and is currently the most certified song in music history.

“Falling Down” by Lil Peep and XXXTentacion which Perry put together with producer John Cunningham shortly after the untimely death of XXXtentacion, who Perry had previously signed to SONGS Music Publishing.

For BTS, Perry was instrumental in finding the song “Dynamite” which would become the group's first ever #1 song on the Billboard Hot 100 for 3 weeks. The song was later nominated for Best Pop Vocal at the 63rd Annual Grammy Awards.

Perry also co-produced and co-wrote BTS’ follow-up single, “Butter,” which broke Spotify's all-time single day streaming record with over 20M global streams in its first day. The song also reached #1 on the Billboard Hot 100 for 10 non-consecutive weeks.

Recognition 

 2022 Billboard Power List: No. 17
 2021 Variety’s Label of the Year
 2020 Variety's Hitmakers Executive of the Year
 2020 Billboard's inaugural Breakthrough Award 
 2020 Billboard's Power 100
 2019 Billboard's Power 100: No. 34
 2018 Variety’s “New Power of New York” list
 2018 Billboard’s Power 100: No. 28
 2017 Variety's 2017 Hitmakers
 2017 Billboard’s Power 100
 2016 Billboard’s inaugural A&R Power Players list
 2014-2016 Billboard’s 40 Under 40 
 2013 The Hollywood Reporter's Top 35 Hitmakers in Music list

In popular culture 

Perry was depicted as himself in three episodes of South Park's 18th season (“The Cissy,” "#Rehash,” and “#HappyHolograms”). In one of the episodes Perry gets into a verbal altercation with Cartman, as Cartman refers to Perry as a "40 year old with a Justin Bieber haircut."

Perry is known to be an avid Nirvana fan and has played “Smells Like Teen Spirit" on guitar alongside Miley Cyrus, and separately, Nirvana's “Lithium” on stage with Post Malone at Coachella 2016.

In 2019, Perry performed guitar alongside John Mayer, Leon Bridges, and Ryan Tedder at his 40th birthday celebration held at The Troubadour in Los Angeles.

References 

1979 births
American music industry executives
Living people